The 1969 USA Outdoor Track and Field Championships men's competition took place on the new all weather running track on the north campus of Miami Dade College in the Westview area near Miami, Florida. The women's division held their championships separately at Welcome Stadium in Dayton, Ohio.  The Marathon championships were at the Western Hemisphere Marathon, in Culver City, California.

Most events were held over imperial distances.

Results

Men track events

Men field events

Women track events

Women field events

See also
United States Olympic Trials (track and field)

References

 Results from T&FN
 results

USA Outdoor Track and Field Championships
USA Outdoor Track And Field Championships, 1969
Track and field
Track and field in Florida
Outdoor Track and Field Championships
Sports in Florida
Track and field in Ohio
Outdoor Track and Field Championships
Outdoor Track and Field Championships
Sports in Ohio